The Flamingo Kid is a 1984 American romantic comedy film directed by Garry Marshall and produced by Michael Phillips. It stars Matt Dillon, Richard Crenna, Héctor Elizondo, and Jessica Walter. The film tells the story of a working class boy who takes a summer job at a beach resort and learns valuable life lessons.

It was the first film to receive a PG-13 rating, although it was the fifth to be released with that rating (after Red Dawn, The Woman in Red, Dreamscape, and Dune). Crenna received a Golden Globe Award nomination for his supporting role and Marisa Tomei made her big screen debut with a minor role in the film.

Plot
In the summer of 1963, Jeffrey Willis joins some friends for a day of gin rummy at El Flamingo Club, a private beach resort. There, he meets the girl of his dreams Carla Sampson. After the gin game and being told of the club's strict policy regarding guests, Jeffrey is upset, but not for long, since he immediately lands a job as a car valet and eventually, cabana steward. Jeffrey is a kid from a middle class Brooklyn family and his father does not approve of him working at the private club.
 
His hero and mentor at the resort is the reigning gin rummy card game champ, Phil Brody, a salesman of exotic sports and luxury cars.

Jeffrey, a winning gin rummy player himself, and his friends admire Brody and how his wins at the Gin rummy table make him seem "psychic," knowing which cards to give up. Brody also takes a liking to Jeffrey, eventually showing him his car business, and gives him hopes that car sales are where he belongs as a career.

Jeffrey gets further immersed in the "easy buck", as evidenced by Phil showing off his success, as opposed to Mr. Willis' manual labor, or the example of Phil's brother, who studied for years to become a lawyer but has had little financial return. During dinner, Jeffrey notably says he "will not be needing college" and plans to pursue being a car salesman instead. Jeffrey and his co-workers at the El Flamingo also venture to Yonkers Raceway together, risking cash on a horse tip but coming up short when the trotter breaks stride.

Eventually, Jeffrey leaves home to pursue the sales job. However, Brody, angry that he disturbed him during a dance class, reveals to him that the job opening at the car dealership is for a stock boy, not as a salesman as Jeffrey had been led to believe was his when he asked for it. Brody lectures Jeffrey in a similar lesson that Mr. Willis had "You can't plant a tree and expect to hang a swing on it the next day", and recommends Jeffrey accept the stock boy job to prove himself and work his way up. 

Jeffrey becomes shocked at his mentor's actions and reconsiders college. Near summer's end, he observes that a regular onlooker, "Big Sid", is feeding signals to Brody, the true cause of his winning. When Big Sid and a member of the gin team playing against Brody's team are overcome by the heat, Jeffrey fills in, opposing Brody, and seeking to help win back the unfair profits Brody won from his friends over the course of the summer. 

Jeffrey and his team eventually win back what was unfairly lost, including a good profit besides. Impressed that he was defeated without cheating, Phil says they can "skip this stock boy nonsense" and offers him the salesman job, but Jeffrey declines. 

Realizing the mistakes he made in rejecting his father's good advice, Jeffrey makes up with his dad in a touching scene at Larry's Fish House ("Any Fish You Wish"), where his family is dining.

Cast

Production
Cass Elliot, of the Mamas & The Papas fame, told producer and friend Michael Phillips about Neil Marshall's script, which took over ten years to finally get made into a film.

Location
The principal location for the movie was the Silver Gull Beach Club in Breezy Point in New York City's Rockaways, inside the Gateway National Recreation Area.

Reception

Box office
The film grossed a total of $23,859,382 domestically.

Critical response
On the review aggreagtor website Rotten Tomatoes, the film holds an approval rating of 85% based on 20 reviews, with an average rating of 6.8/10.

Soundtrack
A soundtrack to the film was released by Motown.

Jesse Frederick – "Breakaway"
Martha and the Vandellas – "(Love Is Like a) Heat Wave"
The Chiffons – "He's So Fine"
Acker Bilk – "Stranger on the Shore"
Dion – "Runaround Sue"
Little Richard – "Good Golly, Miss Molly"
Barrett Strong – "Money (That's What I Want)"
The Impressions – "It's All Right"
Hank Ballard & The Midnighters – "Finger Poppin' Time"
The Chiffons – "One Fine Day"
The Silhouettes – "Get a Job"
Maureen Steele – "Boys Will Be Boys"

Stage musical
A stage musical based on The Flamingo Kid is currently in development for a future Broadway production. The musical features a book and lyrics by Tony Award winner Robert L. Freedman, music by Tony Award nominee Scott Frankel, and direction by Tony Award winner Darko Tresnjak.

Following in the footsteps of Tresnjak and Freedman's Tony Award-winning A Gentleman's Guide to Love and Murder, The Flamingo Kid premiered at Hartford Stage in Hartford, Connecticut, and ran from May 9 to June 15, 2019. The cast included Jimmy Brewer as Jeffrey, Samantha Massell as Karla, Adam Heller as Arthur, Marc Kudisch as Phil Brody, Lesli Margherita as Phyllis Brody, Liz Larsen as Ruth, Lindsey Brett Carothers as Joyce, Ben Fankhauser as Steve, and Alex Wyse as Hawk. The creative team also included Denis Jones (choreographer), Bruce Coughlin (orchestrations), Alexander Dodge (scenic design), Linda Cho (costume design), Philip Rosenberg (lighting design), and Peter Hylenski (sound design).

RemakeDeadline Hollywood announced in September 2012 that Walt Disney Pictures was developing a remake of The Flamingo Kid. Brett Ratner and Michael Phillips were to act as producers on the film, while music video director Nzingha Stewart was working on the script. In 2015, it was reported that ABC Studios was contemplating a half-hour television comedy series based on The Flamingo Kid'', but nothing came of that either.

References

External links
  at MGM
 
 
 

1984 films
1984 romantic comedy films
1980s American films
1980s English-language films
1980s teen comedy films
1980s teen romance films
20th Century Fox films
ABC Motion Pictures films
American romantic comedy films
American teen comedy films
American teen romance films
Films directed by Garry Marshall
Films produced by Michael Phillips (producer)
Films set in 1963
Films set in Long Island
Films set in Manhattan
Films with screenplays by Bo Goldman